The following is a list of seasons played by Dumbarton F.C., detailing performances in each of the major Scottish football competitions entered.  See the links to the specific seasons for details of other competitions, player data etc.

References

External links
Scottish Football Historical Archive
Dumbarton Football Club Historical Archive

Seasons
 
Dumbarton
Seasons